Cala Cala (in hispanicized spelling) or Qala Qala (Aymara qala stone, "a complex of stones") is a small town in Bolivia. In 2010 it had an estimated population of 2,073. it is known for the historic rock paintings.

References

Populated places in La Paz Department (Bolivia)